The Stryker Local School District is a public school district in Williams County, Ohio, United States, based in Stryker, Ohio.

Schools
The Stryker Local School District has one elementary school and one high school.

Elementary schools 
Stryker Elementary School

High school
Stryker High School

References

External links

School districts in Ohio